Alan Robert Ford (December 7, 1923 – November 3, 2008) was an American competition swimmer, Olympic medalist, and former world record-holder in two events.  Ford won a silver medal at the 1948 Summer Olympics in London, and was the first person to swim the 100-yard freestyle in under 50 seconds.

Biography
Born in the Panama Canal Zone, he moved to Sarasota, Florida from Midland, Michigan.  Ford attended U.S schools in the Panama Canal Zone, Mercersburg Academy, and graduated from Yale University with a Bachelor of Science degree in mechanical engineering in 1945.  He served as an ensign in the U.S. Navy during the final months of World War II.

During his prep and university swimming careers, Ford held numerous national and world records.  While at Yale, he trained under swimming coach Robert J. H. Kiphuth, an innovator who introduced dry-land exercises and interval training.  Ford broke Johnny Weissmuller's 17-year-old world record in the 100-yard freestyle.  In 1944, Ford became the first person to swim 100 yards freestyle in less than 50 seconds, swimming's equivalent of running a sub-four-minute mile in track.  Ford became known as the "human fish," an unofficial title he took over from Weissmuller.  This performance was unequaled for eight years.  During his senior year at Yale University, he was the captain of Yale Bulldogs swimming and diving team.

In 1944, when Ford was in the prime of his swimming career, the 1944 Summer Olympics were cancelled because of World War II. That year he won national college titles in the 50-yard and 100-yard freestyle and the 150-yard backstroke. He came out of retirement after the war and returned to New Haven to train with Kiphuth. He had lost as much as 25 pounds of muscle and hadn't been in a pool for three years. After only six months of training, and quitting smoking during that time, he made the U.S. Olympic Team and won a silver medal at the 1948 Summer Olympics in London in the 100 meter freestyle losing to his teammate Wally Ris.

At the US Olympic trials of the 1948 4x200-meter freestyle relay, several swimmers who had already qualified in other events slowed down in their heats or swam fast in the prelims and scratched themselves for the final to allow more swimmers to qualify for the US Olympic Team.

Ultimately, coach Robert Kiphuth did hold a time trial shortly after the actual trials with eleven of the swimmers.  This time trial had Jimmy McLane as first overall with a time of 2:11.0, Bill Smith and Wally Wolf in 2:11.2, and Wally Ris in 2:12.4.  This quartet was used for the Olympic final.  The next four-Eugene Rogers in 2:14.2, Edwin Gilbert in 2:15.4, Robert Gibe in 2:15.6, and William Dudley in 2:15.9, were used in the Olympic prelims. The next three swimmers-Joe Verdeur who came in 2:16.3, Alan Ford in 2;16.4 and George Hoogerhyde in 2:17.4 were not used in the 4x200 freestyle relay.

After his graduation from Yale, Ford went on to become a mechanical engineer.  Ford designed and managed the construction of oil refineries, chemical, ore, and food-processing plants as well as petroleum and chemical storage facilities in the United States and abroad.

Ford was inducted into the International Swimming Hall of Fame as an "Honor Swimmer" in 1966.  At the ceremonies, when Ford was introduced, someone in the audience booed loudly.  The crowd broke into laughter when they realized it was Johnny Weissmuller.

His swimming talents can still be seen in the 1940s film, Blue Winners.

Ford died of emphysema on November 3, 2008, in Sarasota, Florida; he was 84 years old.

See also

 List of Olympic medalists in swimming (men)
 List of Yale University people
 World record progression 100 metres freestyle
 World record progression 4 × 100 metres freestyle relay

References

External links
 
 Alan Ford (USA) – Honor Swimmer profile at International Swimming Hall of Fame 

1923 births
2008 deaths
20th-century American engineers
American male freestyle swimmers
Deaths from emphysema
World record setters in swimming
Olympic gold medalists for the United States in swimming
Swimmers at the 1948 Summer Olympics
United States Navy officers
Yale School of Engineering & Applied Science alumni
Yale Bulldogs men's swimmers
Medalists at the 1948 Summer Olympics
Olympic silver medalists for the United States in swimming
United States Navy personnel of World War II